Noapara, Noāpāra, Naopāra, Nāopāra, Noyapāra, Naoāpāra, Nowapara, or Nawāpāra is the name of 33 places in Bangladesh:

Nāopāra, also called Noapara, located at 
Naopāra, also called Noa Para, located at 
Naopāra, also called Noapara, located at 
Naopāra, also called Noapara, located in Khulna Province, at 
Noyapāra, also called Noapara, located at 
Noāpāra, located at 
Noāpāra, located at 
Noāpāra, located at 
Noāpāra, located at 
Noāpāra, located at 
Noāpāra, located at 
Noāpāra, located at 
Noāpāra, located at 
Noāpāra, also called Nowapara, located at 
Noāpāra, located at 
Noāpāra, located at 
Noāpāra, located at 
Noāpāra, located at 
Noāpāra, located at 
Noāpāra, located in Chittagong Province, at 
Noāpāra, located in Chittagong Province, at 
Noapara, located at 
Nawāpāra, also called Noapara, located at 
Nawāpāra, also called Noapara, located at 
Naoāpāra, also called Noapara, located at 
Naoāpāra, also called Noapara, located at 
Naoāpāra, also called Noapara, located at 
Noāpāra, located in Chittagong Province, at 
Noapara, located in Chittagong Province, at 
Noapāra, located in Chittagong Province, at 
Noāpāra, located in Chittagong Province, at 
Noāpāra, located in Chittagong Province, at 
Noāpāra, located in Chittagong Province, at

References
 

Populated places in Bangladesh